This is a complete list of current bridges of the Kentucky River from its mouth at the Ohio River at Carrollton, Kentucky and Prestonville, Kentucky upstream to the split of the three forks at Beattyville, Kentucky. The entire river is located in Kentucky.

Bridges

See also

Kentucky River

External links

List of historic bridges from Bridge Hunter (text)
List of historic bridges from Bridge Hunter (map)

Crossings Of The Kentucky River
Kentucky River